The Eisenberg is a mountain in the Knüllgebirge (Knüll) in Hesse, Germany.

Mountains of Hesse